Earle Davis Gregory (October 18, 1897 – January 6, 1972) was an American soldier and World War I Medal of Honor recipient for his heroic actions in 1918 during the Meuse-Argonne Offensive in France.

Biography

Earle Davis Gregory was born in Clayville, Virginia on October 18, 1897. Gregory was raised in Chase City, Virginia and graduated from Fork Union Military Academy.

He entered Virginia Polytechnic Institute in 1919, graduating with the Class of 1923. While at VPI, he studied Electrical Engineering. During his senior year, he served as Alpha company commander and President of the Corps of Cadets.  He was voted Most Popular Cadet by his peers during his senior year.

Military service
He enlisted at Chase City, Virginia in the U.S. Army during World War I.  Earle Gregory received the Medal of Honor for actions as a U.S. Army sergeant during the Meuse-Argonne Offensive in World War I.  He is considered to be the first Virginian to receive the medal and often called the Sergeant York of Virginia.

On October 8, 1918, Sgt Earl D. Gregory at Bois-de-Consenvoye, north of Verdun, France, seized a rifle and trench-mortar shell, which he used as a hand grenade.  Shouting "I will get them", he left his detachment of the trench-mortar platoon, and advancing ahead of the infantry, captured a machine gun and three of the enemy. Advancing still farther from the machinegun nest, he captured a 7.5-centimeter mountain howitzer and, entering a dugout in the immediate vicinity, single-handedly captured 19 of the enemy.  For this act he received the Medal of Honor.

Major General Omar Bundy presented Gregory his medal in a ceremony at Camp Lee, Virginia on April 29, 1919.  He was also invested as a Chevalier (Knight) of the French Legion of Honor, and was also awarded the Médaille militaire, Croix de guerre and the Montenegrin Order of Merit for his actions during the Meuse-Argonne Offensive.

Later life
After his discharge from the Army in 1919, Gregory enrolled in the Virginia Polytechnic Institute (VPI) and graduated in 1923.  He pursued a career with the Veterans Administration.  On May 2, 1963, he met President John F. Kennedy at the White House.

On January 6, 1972, Gregory died at his home in Tuscaloosa, Alabama and is buried at the Tuscaloosa Memorial Park. His grave can be found in Section 18, Lot 60.

Military awards 
Gregory's military decorations and awards include:

Other awards - 
Southern Cross of Honor, 1917-1918 pattern (United Daughters of the Confederacy) 
Veterans of Foreign Wars Membership Insignia (VFW)

Medal of Honor Citation
General Orders: War Department, General Orders No. 34 (March 7, 1919)

"The President of the United States in the name of The Congress takes pleasure in presenting the Medal of Honor to

for service as set forth in the following CITATION:
For extraordinary heroism on 8 October 1918, while serving with Headquarters Company, 116th Infantry, 29th Division, in action at Bois-de-Consenvoye, France. With the remark "I will get them," Sergeant Gregory seized a rifle and a trench-mortar shell, which he used as a hand grenade, left his detachment of the trench-mortar platoon, and advancing ahead of the infantry, captured a machinegun and three of the enemy. Advancing still farther from the machinegun nest, he captured a 7.5-centimeter mountain howitzer and, entering a dugout in the immediate vicinity, single-handedly captured 19 of the enemy.
/S/ WOODROW WILSON"

The Gregory Guard
The Virginia Tech Corps of Cadets precision military marching unit, The Gregory Guard, was named in honor of Sgt Gregory in May 1963.

See also

List of Medal of Honor recipients
List of Medal of Honor recipients for World War I

References

External links

 

1897 births
1972 deaths
Military personnel from Virginia
United States Army personnel of World War I
United States Army Medal of Honor recipients
Recipients of the Croix de Guerre 1914–1918 (France)
Recipients of the Legion of Honour
Virginia Tech alumni
United States Army soldiers
People from Powhatan County, Virginia
World War I recipients of the Medal of Honor
People from Chase City, Virginia